David Watson is an English record producer, singer and musician. Born and raised in North London, he has produced albums for Paul Wassif, Mark Abis, Sam Sallon, Dylan Howe and Claudia Brücken, and has worked with artists such as OMD, Rufus Wainwright, Neil Cowley, Beth Rowley, Eric Clapton and Bert Jansch. He is the father of actress Indica Watson.

As a producer
In 2006 Watson recorded and produced Translation Volume 1 – Live in Soho by the Dylan Howe Quintet with Dylan Howe, and the album was released to critical acclaim.

In 2009, Watson began work on an album by the blues/folk guitarist Paul Wassif, which featured the musicians Eric Clapton and Bert Jansch. The album Looking Up Feeling Down was recorded in London's Metropolis Studios, and was released in 2011 on Black Brown & White. It turned out to be Jansch's last appearance on a record before his death in October that year.

Along with Paul Humphreys of British electro band OMD, Watson produced German electropop singer Claudia Brücken's live retrospective album This Happened in 2012. The album was recorded and filmed at the Scala in London's King's Cross, and features guest appearances from Heaven 17, Andy Bell, Andrew Poppy and Propaganda.

Watson worked for over two years on singer-songwriter Sam Sallon's debut album One for the Road which was released in 2013 on Indigo-Octagon. The album features contributions from The Rails singer Kami Thompson, guitarist Paul Wassif and pianist Neil Cowley. Mojo Magazine praised the album as "a finely crafted debut", while Maverick Magazine called it "a potential album of the year".

As a performer
Watson has performed and recorded with many various artists and groups. In July 2004, he sang the Italian piece "L' Ombra della Luce" by Franco Battiato with the Remasterpiece Orchestra featuring Chris Coco and Sasha Puttnam headlining at The Big Chill festival.

Watson sang with Claudia Brücken at her career retrospective concert This Happened in March 2011. The CD and DVD was released on There (There) in 2012, and he subsequently toured as a member of Brücken's band in the UK and Europe. In 2013, Watson contributed backing vocals to Orchestral Manoeuvres in the Dark's English Electric album. In 2017, Watson again contributed backing vocals to OMD's The Punishment of Luxury.

In December 2013, Watson performed and sang with Paul Wassif at the concert "A Celebration of Bert Jansch" at London's Royal Festival Hall alongside Robert Plant, Lisa Knapp, Donovan and various members of Pentangle, amongst others. The concert was broadcast by BBC Four in the UK on 28 March 2014 under the name The Genius of Bert Jansch: Folk Blues and Beyond.

He is currently a member of blues folk trio, Three Pilgrims, with Mark Abis and Paul Wassif.

Selected discography
 Dylan Howe Quintet - Translation Volume 1 – Live in Soho (2006)
 Paul Wassif - Looking Up Feeling Down (2011)
 Claudia Brücken - This Happened (2012)
 Sam Sallon - Kathy's Song EP (2013)
 Sam Sallon - One for the Road (2013)
 OMD - English Electric (2013)
 OMD - The Punishment of Luxury (2017)
 Indica Watson - I That Am Lost  (2017)
 Jack Adaptor - The Spoiler Versions (2018)
 Jack Adaptor - Spirit Is The Power (2018)
 Jack Adaptor - The Gilded Sound (2019) 
 Mark Abis - Live at Broadhempston (2019)
 Andrew Poppy - Hoarse Songs (2019)
 Mark Abis - China Ship (2020)

References

English record producers
English male singers
English folk guitarists
English male guitarists
English songwriters
Singers from London
Musicians from London
Living people
Year of birth missing (living people)
British male songwriters